Dancing on Wheels is a British Reality TV show made by production company Fever Media and first broadcast on BBC Three on 11 February 2010. The concept of the show is that an able-bodied celebrity dances with a wheelchair user. The couples dance each week, and each week one couple is eliminated in a dance-off. In the final, the two remaining couples both perform two dances, and one couple wins the show and is selected to represent the UK in the European Championships.

Judges
The judges for the first series were:

Choreographers
The choreographers for the first series were:

Contestants
The contestants for the first series were:

See also
 Wheelchair DanceSport

External links
 
 American DanceWheels Foundation
 Wheelchair Dance Sport Association UK National Body

2010 British television series debuts
2010 British television series endings
Wheelchair sports
Dancesport
Dance competition television shows
BBC Television shows
Television shows about disability